(OSE: 9508) is a Japanese energy company that provides power to 7 prefectures (Fukuoka, Nagasaki, Ōita, Saga, Miyazaki, Kumamoto, Kagoshima), and recently, to some parts of Hiroshima Prefecture. In 2011 the company was criticised for attempting to manipulate public opinion in favor of reactivating two reactors at the Genkai Nuclear Power Plant.

History 
Kyushu Electric Power was founded on 1 May 1951. The company began supplying electricity to Hiroshima in November 2005 - the first provider in Japan to supply energy outside its area.

See also 

 Fukushima Daiichi nuclear disaster
 Kagoshima Nanatsujima Mega Solar Power Plant
 Nuclear power in Japan

References

Electric power companies of Japan
Nuclear power companies of Japan
Kyushu region
Energy companies established in 1951
Non-renewable resource companies established in 1951
Companies listed on the Osaka Exchange
Companies listed on the Tokyo Stock Exchange
Japanese companies established in 1951